Gaël Kakudji (born 6 July 1999) is a Congolese professional footballer who plays as a defender for the Belgian club Antwerp in the Belgian First Division A.

Professional career
Kakudji was born in Belgium, and is of Congolese descent. He played football with Seraing and Gent alongside boxing and rugby as an adolescent, and moved to Antwerp in 2018. Kakudji made his professional debut with Antwerp in a 3–0 Belgian First Division A win over Cercle Brugge on 9 December 2018.

International career
Kakudji was called up to the DR Congo U23s for 2019 Africa U-23 Cup of Nations qualification matches in March 2019.

References

External links
 
 RTBF Profile

1999 births
Living people
People from Lubumbashi
Citizens of the Democratic Republic of the Congo through descent
Democratic Republic of the Congo footballers
Belgian footballers
Belgian sportspeople of Democratic Republic of the Congo descent
Royal Antwerp F.C. players
Belgian Pro League players
Association football defenders